Denis Ivanovich Krivoshlykov (born May 10, 1971 in Moscow) is a Russian team handball player and Olympic Champion from 2000 in Sydney.  He received a bronze medal at the 2004 Summer Olympics in Athens with the Russian national team.

References

1971 births
Living people
Russian male handball players
Olympic handball players of Russia
Handball players at the 1996 Summer Olympics
Handball players at the 2000 Summer Olympics
Handball players at the 2004 Summer Olympics
Handball players at the 2008 Summer Olympics
Olympic gold medalists for Russia
Olympic bronze medalists for Russia
Sportspeople from Moscow
Olympic medalists in handball
Medalists at the 2004 Summer Olympics
Medalists at the 2000 Summer Olympics